The Forbes family is one of the components of the Boston Brahmins—they are a wealthy extended American family long prominent in Boston, Massachusetts. The family's fortune originates from trading opium and tea between North America and China in the 19th century plus other investments in the same period.  The name descends from Scottish immigrants and can be traced back to Sir John de Forbes in Scotland in the 12th century. Family members include businessman John Murray Forbes (1813–1898), part of the first generation who accumulated wealth, and politician John Forbes Kerry (born 1943).

Family origins

The first member of the Forbes family to live in the United States was Rev. John Forbes (1740–1783). He was a clergyman who arrived to the colonies in 1763. The Reverend's first post on the North American continent was in British East Florida, where he became the first Anglican clergyman licensed to officiate during the English period of 1763–1783. The Forbes family has a link to the Dudley–Winthrop family directly from Thomas Dudley (1576–1653), father of Anne Bradstreet (1612–1672), the first English-language female poet from America. John Forbes left Florida for Boston in 1769 and married Dorothy Murray on February 2, 1769 in Milton, Massachusetts, where their first son James Grant Forbes was born. John Forbes has two other sons: John Murray Forbes and Ralph Bennet Forbes.

Accumulation of wealth

Trade with China 

The Boston trading firm Perkins & Company sent many young men of their extended family to participate in their business activities abroad. Ralph Forbes being married to Margaret Perkins, their children were encouraged in the business. Following the death overseas of his older brother, Thomas Tunno Forbes, the Perkinses encouraged John Murray Forbes to travel to China, too. There John was mentored by the Chinese merchant Houqua who treated him like a son and therefore entrusted very significant sums of capital to invest on his behalf in the US after he left China (see below).

Perkins & Co., like many other Boston trading firms in the early 19th century, sent ships to China to get tea for sale in America (although some was ultimately re-exported to Britain and Europe). To pay for the tea, they exported to China large quantities of silver and also furs, manufactured goods, cloth, wood, opium and any other items that they thought the Chinese market would absorb. Active trading houses, particularly those from Boston, usually kept representatives resident in Hong Kong whose main role was to look for and secure quality tea for export at good prices. This was John Murray Forbes' main job during the two years he spent in China. John Murray Forbes' brother, Robert Bennet Forbes, was more intimately involved in the importing side of the business and, at least by their own writings, had a more direct role than did John in the opium trade.

Until recently, the Museum of the American China Trade in Milton, Mass., on Boston's South Shore, was curated by a Forbes great-grandson, Dr. H. A. Crosby Forbes, an expert on Chinese porcelain. The museum, which was housed in Robert Bennet Forbes' 1833 Greek Revival style house, was a monument to the China merchants and the great wealth in Boston that both drove and resulted from the China trade. The China trade museum was merged with the Peabody Essex Museum in 1984 leaving the house in the management of the Forbes House Charitable Trust which operates it now as the Captain Forbes House Museum.

Neither John nor Robert spent more than a relatively short time in China—John was there for two years. Upon his return to Boston, John continued interest in the China trade for a few more years, serving as a business/investment manager for voyages undertaken by Robert and others. Fairly soon, however, he recognized that the China trade was becoming increasingly difficult to pursue profitably and that railroads offered a new and much more lucrative opportunity.

Railroad investment

Due to the close bond relationship and trust he still maintained in Boston with Howqua, he was given $200,000 of Howqua capital to invest in US business opportunities, to invest on behalf of his Chinese mentor in the US (Ujifusa 2018 Chapter 3). Deploying this capital in the US, John Murray Forbes made a considerable fortune from investments in railroads from the 1840s onwards.  Some of the population growth of Chicago and Midwestern Plains states in the middle to late 19th century was due to John Murray Forbes' railroad projects in Michigan and Chicago. The Chicago, Burlington & Quincy Railroad, from Chicago west to the Mississippi, was built by John Murray Forbes who had a reputation for sound financial management amongst the railroad tycoons of the day.

Family assets

Some Forbes family members remain generally influential in local or national politics.

In the 1840s, John Murray Forbes bought Naushon Island, which is one of the Elizabeth Islands northwest of Martha's Vineyard and southwest of Cape Cod, and within the town of Gosnold, Massachusetts. Forbes and his descendants have used the property as a summer retreat since then.  The property is presently owned by a Forbes family corporation, the Naushon Trust, Inc.

Family members

Noted as businessmen

 Colonel James Grant Forbes (1769–1826), engaged in the West India trade in Port-au-Prince (Haiti), served as an army officer during the War of 1812, went as envoy in 1821 to receive the relinquishment of the Floridas from the Spanish authority in Cuba, Governor of East Florida.
 Grandson of John Forbes, John Murray Forbes (1813–1898), born in France, John Murray Forbes was the first of the family to enter the China trade and later invested in railroads and amassed a large fortune.
 Francis Blackwell Forbes (1839–1908), poppy botanist, wrote a book on Chinese plants, opium trader in the China trade.
 William Hathaway Forbes (1840–1897), son of John Murray Forbes, businessman. Investor in, and later president of, the Bell Telephone Company.
 Francis Murray Forbes (1874–1961), American businessman, son of Francis Blackwell Forbes and wife Isabel Clark. Co-founder of Cabot, Cabot & Forbes.
 James Grant Forbes II (1879–1955), American lawyer, banker and businessman, son of Francis Blackwell Forbes and wife Isabel Clark. Was born in Shanghai, China, where the Forbes amassed a fortune from the opium trade and merchant banking after the Opium Wars. The grandfather of Brice Lalonde and John Forbes Kerry.
 Another grandson of John Forbes Robert Bennet Forbes (1804–1889), Partner of Russell & Company, and later associated with Yale University development and endowment.

Noted as politicians and activists

Many Forbes family members are influential in local or national politics in France, the US and the Philippines:

 John Forbes Kerry (born 1943), United States Special Presidential Envoy for Climate 2021–, United States Secretary of State 2013–2017, United States Senator 1985–2013 and Democratic party candidate in the 2004 United States presidential election. 
 William Cameron Forbes (1870–1959)  used his wealth to become Governor General of the Philippines and ambassador to Japan. 
 Edward Waldo Forbes (1873–1969) served as the Director of the Fogg Art Museum at Harvard University from 1909 to 1944. Under his leadership, the art collection was vastly expanded, and a new building was constructed in 1927. The Museum Course, run by EWF and Paul J. Sachs revolutionized museology in the United States.
 Brice Lalonde, an environmental activist who is John Forbes Kerry's first cousin and friend. Lalonde is a French Green party politician who was a candidate in the 1981 French presidential election and the mayor of Saint-Briac-sur-Mer near the Forbes family estate in France from 1995 to 2008. He was a high-profile member of the UN and its Special Adviser on Sustainable Development. 
 James Colt (1932–2008), a descendant of John Murray Forbes, part-owner of Naushon Island, the Forbes family estate off Falmouth, an attorney specializing in trusts and estates, served as a Massachusetts state representative, a trustee for 30 years, serving as managing trustee for seven.
 Ruth Forbes Young (1903–1998), founder of the International Peace Academy with purpose of studying UN peacekeeping and developing peacekeeping doctrine, she was married to the inventor and helicopter pioneer Arthur Middleton Young.

Other family members

The first members of the family to live in the United States was John Forbes, clergyman, son of 
Archibald Forbes, although the family retained its connections with Europe and John Murray Forbes was born in France.

 John Murray Forbes (1807–1885), m. to Anne Howell, (d. 1849)
 Brice Lalonde, a French politician, who ran for President of France as the Green Party candidate in 1981.
 Rosemary Forbes Kerry (1913–2002), m. to Richard Kerry.
 Elliot Forbes (1917–2006), conductor and musicologist
 John Murray Forbes (1813–1898), an American railroad magnate, merchant, philanthropist and abolitionist, m. to Sarah Swain Hathaway, (1813–1900).
 John Malcolm Forbes (1847–1904), American businessman and sportsman. 
 Michael R. Paine (1928–2018), m. to Ruth Hyde Paine, Oswald family benefactors in whose garage family friend Lee Harvey Oswald stored his rifle and in whose home Marina Oswald lived.
 William Cameron Forbes (1870–1959), investment banker and diplomat, served as Governor-General of the Philippines from 1908 to 1913.
 China Forbes (born 1970), singer and songwriter, best known as lead singer of Pink Martini.
 Maya Forbes (born 1968) is an American screenwriter and television producer, sister of China Forbes.
 Ed Droste (born 1978), singer and musician, lead singer of Grizzly Bear, grandson of Elliot Forbes.
 Beatrice Forbes Manz, professor of history at Tufts University

Network

Associates

Charles Pickering Bowditch
Erastus Corning
John Perkins Cushing
Warren Delano Jr.
Raymond Emerson
Howqua
John Cleve Green
Norman Wait Harris
Henry Lee Higginson
Gardiner Greene Hubbard
James Frederick Joy
Thomas Lauderdale
Charles Elliott Perkins
William Sturgis
Nathaniel Thayer Jr.

Businesses

Bell Telephone Company
Burlington & Missouri River Rail Road
Cabot, Cabot & Forbes
Chicago, Burlington and Quincy Railroad
Forbes Lithograph Manufacturing Company
Hannibal and St. Joseph Railroad
Harris, Forbes & Co.
J.M. Forbes & Co.
Michigan Central Railroad
National Bank of China
Russell & Company
St. Mary's Falls Ship Canal Company
 St. Paul, Minneapolis & Manitoba Railway
Walter Baker & Company
Welch & Forbes, LLC

Philanthropy & non-profit organizations

Harvard River Associates
Hong Kong Jockey Club
International Peace Academy
Loyal Publication Society
Manila Polo Club
Milton Academy
Nuclear-Disarmament Organization Council for a Livable World
Sailors' Snug Harbor of Boston
Union Club of Boston

Buildings, estates & historic landmarks

Birdwood (Thomasville, Georgia)
Briar Patch (Sands Point, New York)
Captain Robert Bennet Forbes House
Gerry's Point
Laucala
Les Essarts
Naushon Island
Rosa Hill
Three Pines

Sources

Life and Recollections of John Murray Forbes, ed. by Sarah Forbes Hughes, Two Volumes, Houghton, Mifflin & Co., 1899.
An American Railroad Builder: John Murray Forbes, by Henry Pearson, Houghton, Mifflin & Co., 1911.
Forbes: Telephone Pioneer, by Arthur Pier, 1953.
The Bingham Genealogy Project, by Doug Bingham, https://web.archive.org/web/20050427081147/http://www.pa.uky.edu/~shapere/dkbingham/d0007/g0000017.html, 2003
Boston Men on the Northwest Coast: The American Fur Trade, 1788-1844, by Mary Malloy, University of Alaska Press, 1998.
Bonds of Enterprise: John Murray Forbes and Western Development in America's Railway Age, John Lauritz Larson,  Iowa City: University of Iowa Press, 2001.
Otter Skins, Boston Ships, and China Goods: The Maritime Fur Trade of the Northwest Coast, 1785-1841, by James R. Gibson, McGill-Queen's University Press, 2001.
Letters from China: The Canton-Boston Correspondence of Robert Bennet Forbes, 1838 – 1840, ed. by Phyllis Forbes Kerr, Mystic Seaport Museum, 1996.
Barons of the Sea: Race to Build the Fastest Clipper Ship; Simon & Schuster; First Edition (July 17, 2018).

References

External links

Website of the Captain Forbes House Museum in Milton, MA
Forbes Family Business Records at Baker Library Historical Collections, Harvard Business School
James Murray Forbes Papers at Massachusetts Historical Society (Boston, MA)
Mary Bowditch Forbes Papers at Massachusetts Historical Society (Boston, MA)

 
History of Hong Kong
American families of Scottish ancestry
Business families of the United States
Families from Massachusetts
Political families of the United States